August Ivan Nepomuk Eduard Šenoa (originally Schönoa; 14 November 1838 – 13 December 1881) was a Croatian novelist. Born to an ethnic German and Slovak family, Šenoa became a key figure in the development of an independent literary tradition in Croatian and shaping the emergence of the urban Croatian identity of Zagreb and its surroundings at a time when Austrian control was weaning. He was a literary transitional figure, who helped bring Croatian literature from Romanticism to Realism and introduced the historical novel to Croatia. He wrote more than ten novels, among which the most notable are: Zlatarovo zlato (The Goldsmith's Treasure; 1871), Čuvaj se senjske ruke (Pirates of Senj; 1876), Seljačka buna (Peasants' revolt; 1877), and Diogenes (1878).

Šenoa was one of the most popular Croatian novelists in his day, and the author of the popular patriotic song "Živila Hrvatska".

Life 

He was born in Zagreb, then part of the Habsburg Empire, into a family of Slovak-German origin. His surname was originally spelled Schönoa. His father was Alois Schönoa, and mother was Terezija Rabacs, a Slovak woman from Budapest. He studied law in Prague. He also lived in Vienna for a while, but returned to Zagreb in 1866. He died in Zagreb at the age of 43.

From 1874 to 1881, he edited the literary journal Vijenac ("Wreath").

He died from disease picked up after the 1880 Zagreb earthquake.

Work 

In his novels, he fused national romanticism characterized by buoyant and inventive language with realistic depictions of the growth of the petite bourgeois class.

This "father of the Croatian novel" (and modern national literature) is known for his mass Cecildemillean scenes and poetic description of oppressed Croatian peasantry and nobility struggling against foreign rule (Venetians, Austrians/Germans and Hungarians) and romanticised period from the 15th to the 18th century. It has become a commonplace phrase that "Šenoa created the Croatian reading public", especially by writing in a popular style.

Legacy

In 2008, a total of 182 streets in Croatia were named after August Šenoa, making him the person with the seventh most streets in the country named after him.

Šenoa's birth house is located at 27 Ivo Mallin House. It is open to visitors. The house suffered damage in the 2020 Zagreb earthquake, but was later reopened.

References

Further reading

Sources

August Šenoa  at the Zagreb City Museum

1838 births
1881 deaths
Writers from Zagreb
Croatian people of German descent
Croatian people of Slovak descent
Croatian novelists
Croatian male writers
Male novelists
Burials at Mirogoj Cemetery
19th-century novelists
19th-century male writers
19th-century Croatian writers